Nelson Donald Emerson (born August 17, 1967) is a Canadian former professional ice hockey right winger. He played for eight teams in the National Hockey League during his 12-year career, which lasted from 1990 to 2002.

Playing career
Emerson grew up playing minor hockey in his hometown of Waterford, Ontario with the Waterford Wildcats of the OMHA.  Emerson was selected in the 7th round (92nd overall) of the 1985 OHL Priority Selection by the Guelph Platers after spending the 1984-85 season with the Stratford Cullitons Jr.B. (OHA) club. Emerson, however, elected to pursue an NCAA scholarship and spent a second year playing with the Cullitons before attending Bowling Green State University (CCHA) in Ohio in 1986-87.

Emerson was drafted in the third round, 44th overall, by the St. Louis Blues in the 1985 NHL Entry Draft.

After playing four seasons at the Bowling Green State University, where Emerson was a 3-time finalist for the Hobey Baker Award, Emerson made his professional debut with the Blues' IHL affiliate, the Peoria Rivermen, at the end of the 1989–90 season. In his first and only full season with the Rivermen, 1990–91, he scored 36 goals and added 79 assists.

Emerson joined the Blues in the 1991–92 season, and scored 132 points in his two full seasons with them. He joined the Winnipeg Jets before the 1993–94 season, and had the most productive campaign of his NHL career that year (33 goals, 41 assists). He played one more season with the Jets before leaving for the Hartford Whalers before the 1995–96 season.

Emerson played two seasons in Hartford, then moved along with the franchise as it became the Carolina Hurricanes in the 1997–98 season. During the 1998–99 season, Emerson became a member of the Chicago Blackhawks. Later in the same season, the Blackhawks traded him to the Ottawa Senators in exchange for Chris Murray.

Emerson joined the expansion Atlanta Thrashers in the 1999–2000 season, and played 58 games with them. He was traded late in the season, along with Kelly Buchberger, to the Los Angeles Kings in exchange for Donald Audette and Frantisek Kaberle. Emerson would remain with the Kings until retiring following the 2001–02 season.

Emerson appeared in 771 NHL games in his career, scoring 195 goals and adding 293 assists. He also appeared in 40 Stanley Cup playoff games, scoring seven goals and recording 15 assists.

Emerson was hired by the Los Angeles Kings as a video and player development consultant and, after 2 seasons, was promoted to assistant coach/development coordinator on August 4, 2008. He is currently Director of Player Personnel for the Kings.

Career statistics

Regular season and playoffs

International

Awards and honours

References

External links

1967 births
Living people
Atlanta Thrashers players
Bowling Green Falcons men's ice hockey players
Canadian ice hockey right wingers
Carolina Hurricanes players
Chicago Blackhawks players
Hartford Whalers players
Ice hockey people from Ontario
Los Angeles Kings coaches
Los Angeles Kings players
Ottawa Senators players
Peoria Rivermen (IHL) players
St. Louis Blues draft picks
St. Louis Blues players
Sportspeople from Hamilton, Ontario
Sportspeople from Norfolk County, Ontario
Winnipeg Jets (1979–1996) players
Canadian ice hockey coaches
AHCA Division I men's ice hockey All-Americans